Cindy Shenberger (born June 12, 1969, in Vallejo, California) is an American sport shooter. She competed at the 2000 Summer Olympics in the women's skeet event, in which she placed fifth.

References

1969 births
Living people
Skeet shooters
American female sport shooters
Shooters at the 2000 Summer Olympics
Olympic shooters of the United States
Shooters at the 1999 Pan American Games
Pan American Games medalists in shooting
Pan American Games silver medalists for the United States
Sportspeople from Vallejo, California
Medalists at the 1999 Pan American Games
21st-century American women